Le Bien Public is a regional daily newspaper published in Dijon in north-east France.

History and profile
Le Bien Public was established in 1868. The paper is published by Groupe EBRA. The daily had a circulation of 52,200 copies in 1990 and 51,500 copies in 1992. The daily had a circulation of 35,179 copies in 2020.

References

External links
Official website

1868 establishments in France
Mass media in Dijon
Daily newspapers published in France
Newspapers established in 1868